Avgust is a male given name.

Russian name
In Russian, Avgust ( or ) is a male given name. Its feminine versions are Avgusta and Avgustina. The name is derived from the Latin word augustus, which means majestic, but originally meant devoted to an augur (a priest who practiced augury, interpreting the will of the gods by studying the flight of birds).

The name was included into various, often handwritten, church calendars throughout the 17th–19th centuries, but was omitted from the official Synodal Menologium at the end of the 19th century. In 1924–1930, the name was included into various Soviet calendars, which included the new and often artificially created names promoting the new Soviet realities and encouraging the break with the tradition of using the names in the Synodal Menologia.

Its diminutives include Ava, Gutya, Gusta, Gustya, and Gustey.

The patronymics derived from "Avgust" are "" (Avgustovich; masculine) and "" (Avgustovna; feminine).

"Avgust" is also a colloquial form of the given name Avgustin.

People with the name
Avgust Černigoj (1898–1985), Slovenian/Yugoslavian painter, avant-garde experimenter in Constructivism
Avgust Demšar, (born 1962), Slovenian detective fiction writer
Avgust Ipavec (born 1940), Slovenian composer and priest
Avgust Pavel, Slovenian spelling of the name of Ágoston Pável (born 1886), Hungarian Slovene writer, poet, ethnologist, linguist, and historian
Avgust Pirjevec (1887–1944), Slovene literary scholar, lexicographer, and librarian
Avgust Tsivolko (1810–1839), Russian navigator and Arctic explorer

See also
August (disambiguation)
Avguštine 
Sebastian (name)

References

Notes

Sources
Н. А. Петровский (N. A. Petrovsky). "Словарь русских личных имён" (Dictionary of Russian First Names). ООО Издательство "АСТ". Москва, 2005. 
В. А. Никонов (V. A. Nikonov). "Ищем имя" (Looking for a Name). Изд. "Советская Россия". Москва, 1988. 
[1] А. В. Суперанская (A. V. Superanskaya). "Современный словарь личных имён: Сравнение. Происхождение. Написание" (Modern Dictionary of First Names: Comparison. Origins. Spelling). Айрис-пресс. Москва, 2005. 
[2] А. В. Суперанская (A. V. Superanskaya). "Словарь русских имён" (Dictionary of Russian Names). Издательство Эксмо. Москва, 2005. 

Russian masculine given names
Slovene masculine given names

sl:Avgust